The Hudson Apartments (formerly The Historic Hillview Hollywood) is a historical building located on Hollywood Boulevard, and is considered Hollywood's first "artist's" high-rise. It was founded in 1917 by movie moguls Jesse L. Lasky, co-founder of Paramount Pictures, and his brother-in-law Samuel Goldwyn, co-founder of Metro-Goldwyn-Mayer, better known as MGM. It was one of Hollywood's only apartment buildings at the time willing to rent to aspiring actors since they were considered a financial risk by most apartment building owners. In fact, it catered specifically to actors. It quickly became a Hollywood hot spot. The vast basement housed a rehearsal space until Rudolph Valentino reputedly converted it to a speakeasy. Former big-screen residents include Mae Busch, Stan Laurel, and Viola Dana. Charlie Chaplin was once a proprietor of the Hillview. Clara Bow found her first home at the Hillview in 1923.

The Hillview eventually slipped into obscurity and went into ruin. The building was occupied by tenants until it suffered structural damage during the  1994 Northridge earthquake and later, the construction of the subway tunnel.  A fire occurred in early 2002, and was refurbished. The building was  restored and completely redone in 2005-2006 with new kitchens, marble counter tops, washer dryers in each unit and refurbished elevators.

In October 2009 the corporation that owns the Hollywood Hillview Apartments filed for bankruptcy, and the historic Hollywood Hillview was forced into foreclosure. The basement lounge club, the restaurant, and the gym have been closed since January 2009. The name was also changed to The Hudson Apartments.

In July 2010 Hollywood real estate investment group CIM purchased the building out of foreclosure for $13,000,000. 

In October 2021, Adolfo Suaya sold The Hillview for $19.2 million, as a 53-unit dwelling, to True Urban USA and JCI Development.

References

External links 
  Investment Offering Brochure - Lee and Associates Los Angeles West, Inc.

Landmarks in Los Angeles
Culture of Los Angeles
Culture of Hollywood, Los Angeles
Apartment buildings in Los Angeles
Buildings and structures in Hollywood, Los Angeles